An aminohydrolase is a hydrolase enzyme which acts upon an amino group.

Aminohydrolases are classified under EC number EC 3.5.4.

External links
 

EC 3.5